Moran & Cato was the largest chain of grocery stores in Australia in the late nineteenth and early twentieth century. The partnership was established in Melbourne on 24 July 1882 when Frederick John Cato joined his cousin Thomas Edwin Moran who ran two grocery stores in Fitzroy and Carlton. Moran died in 1890 at the age of 39 and was succeeded by his widow. The following years saw expansion into Tasmania and New South Wales and incorporation of the company in 1912.

By 1935 the company was employing nearly one thousand people and had about 120 branches in Victoria and Tasmania and 40 in New South Wales. In 1962, it was still the largest independent retail grocery chain and wholesaler in Australia and a competitor to Coles Supermarkets and Woolworths Supermarkets, and had largely converted its stores to the self-service model in 1957–1961.

The company was taken over by competitor Permewan Wright Limited in 1969.

References

Defunct retail companies of Australia
Retail companies established in 1881
Retail companies disestablished in 1969
Australian grocers
Fitzroy, Victoria
Australian companies disestablished in 1969
Australian companies established in 1881
Companies based in Melbourne
Defunct supermarkets of Australia